Margaret M. Markey (born November 4, 1941) is an American politician who formerly represented District 30 in the New York State Assembly, which is made up of Maspeth and Woodside, as well as portions of Middle Village, Astoria, Sunnyside and Long Island City. She is a Democrat.

Career
A graduate of Berkeley Business School, Markey began in public service as the assistant director of economic development for former Queens Borough President Claire Shulman, later becoming the borough's director of marketing and tourism. She was first elected to the New York State Assembly in 1998. She is the current chairwoman of the Tourism, Parks, Arts and Sports Development; as well as previously holding the position of president of the Irish American Legislators Society.

In 2009, a controversial bill presented by Markey sought to tackle sex abuse cases in private schools. Critics have argued that the legislation is unfair because it appears to target Catholic schools, while the vast majority of sexual abuse has occurred in public schools under the state's control.

In March 2010, Markey co-sponsored, along with assembly members N. Nick Perry and Félix Ortiz, a bill that would prohibit the use of all forms of salt in the preparation and cooking of all restaurant food, with customers having the option to add salt once served.

Markey lost re-election to the Assembly in 2016, defeated in the Democratic primary for District 30 to Woodside attorney Brian Barnwell, aged 30. Markey saw her political fortunes change for the worse when she failed to show up at community events and protests in relation to a proposed homeless shelter in the neighborhood of Maspeth, in a somewhat similar fashion to her Assembly predecessor Joe Crowley's loss in his U.S. House primary two years later.

Personal life
Markey resides in Maspeth with her husband, State Supreme Court Judge Charles Markey. They have three children: Charles, John, and Margaret.

References

External links
 NY Dems - Biographical information

1941 births
Living people
Democratic Party members of the New York State Assembly
Women state legislators in New York (state)
Haas School of Business alumni
People from Maspeth, Queens
21st-century American politicians
21st-century American women politicians